Truth or Consequences (often abbreviated as T or C), originally known as Hot Springs, New Mexico, is a city in the U.S. state of New Mexico, and the county seat of Sierra County. In 2020, the population was 6,052. It has frequently been noted on lists of unusual place names for having chosen to rename itself in March 1950 after the Truth or Consequences radio show. The name is often hyphenated (Truth-or-Consequences, T-or-C) for clarity, though the formal name contains no punctuation.

History
The area is noted for its hot springs, and the first public bath in the area was built at John Cross Ranch over Geronimo Springs in the late 19th century. The hot springs are part of the Hot Springs Artesian Basin. However, major settlement did not begin until the construction of Elephant Butte Dam and its reservoir in 1912; the dam was completed in 1916. It was a part of the Rio Grande Project, an early large-scale irrigation effort authorized under the Newlands Reclamation Act of 1902. In 1916, the town was incorporated as Hot Springs. It became the Sierra County seat in 1937. By the late 1930s, Hot Springs was filled with 40 different natural-hot-spring spas — one per every 75 residents at the time — though primarily catering to visitors.

The city changed its name from Hot Springs to Truth or Consequences as the result of a radio show contest. In March 1950, Ralph Edwards, the host of the popular NBC Radio quiz show Truth or Consequences,  announced that he would air the program on its 10th anniversary from the first town that renamed itself after the show; Hot Springs officially changed its name on March 31, 1950, and the program was broadcast from there the following evening. Edwards visited the town during the first weekend of May for the next 50 years. This event became known as Fiesta and eventually included a beauty contest, a parade, and a stage show. The city still celebrates Fiesta each year during the first weekend of May. The parade generally features local dignitaries, last year's Miss Fiesta pageant queen, and the winner of Hatch Chile Queen pageant. Fiesta also features a dance in Ralph Edwards Park.

Hot springs
Several hot springs are located in Truth or Consequences.

Before World War II, there were about 40 hot springs spas in Truth or Consequences. By 2008, the Hot Springs Association in Truth or Consequences had 10 spa facilities as members. Five of those obtained their water from wells, and La Paloma Hot Springs & Spa (formerly Marshall Hot Springs), Riverbend Hot Springs, Indian Springs Bath House, Artesian Bath house and Hay-Yo-Kay Hot Springs are from free-flowing hot springs.

The New Mexico Department of Energy, Minerals, and Natural Resources created two demonstration projects using geothermal energy in Truth or Consequences in the 1980s. The Carrie Tingley Hospital, for children with physical disabilities, used state funding to create a physical-therapy program in Truth or Consequences, but has since moved to Albuquerque. The local Senior Citizen's Center benefits from a geothermal space heating system.

Geography

The city is located on the Rio Grande, near Elephant Butte Reservoir. The city is served by the Truth or Consequences Municipal Airport, Interstate 25, I-25 Business, New Mexico State Road 51 (NM 51), NM 181 and NM 187.

Climate
Truth or Consequences has a cool desert climate (Köppen BWk) with three main seasons. The summer season from April to June is very dry and generally hot with large diurnal temperature variation, giving way in July to the monsoon season which remains very hot – and is more uncomfortable due to the hotter nights – but is much more humid as rainfall from thunderstorms is frequent. The winter season from October to March has pleasantly mild and sunny days and cold to very cold nights, with very occasional rainfall from extratropical cyclones.

On average over the year, 88.6 days top , 12.9 days top , and 91.1 nights fall below . Temperatures have fallen below  only twice since 1951, during 1987 and 2011, with the record low being  on February 3, 2011. The lowest maximum temperature on record has been  on December 25, 1987, but during most years every single day will top freezing and on average only 19.5 days fail to top .

Precipitation is generally scarce apart from monsoonal storms.

Demographics

As of the census of 2000, there were 7,289 people, 3,450 households, and 1,859 families residing in the city. The population density was 576.0 people per square mile (222.5/km). There were 4,445 housing units at an average density of 351.3 per square mile (135.7/km). The racial makeup of the city was 85.35% White, 0.63% African American, 1.77% Native American, 0.16% Asian, 0.05% Pacific Islander, 9.36% from other races, and 2.68% from two or more races. Hispanic or Latino of any race were 27.4% of the population.

There were 3,450 households, out of which 20.2% had children under the age of 18 living with them, 40.5% were married couples living together, 10.3% had a female householder with no husband present, and 46.1% were non-families. 41.2% of all households were made up of individuals, and 22.1% had someone living alone who was 65 years of age or older. The average household size was 2.04 and the average family size was 2.75.

In the city, the population was spread out, with 20.2% under the age of 18, 5.7% from 18 to 24, 20.1% from 25 to 44, 24.6% from 45 to 64, and 29.3% who were 65 years of age or older. The median age was 48 years. For every 100 females, there were 96.8 males. For every 100 females age 18 and over, there were 92.4 males.

The median income for a household in the city was $20,986, and the median income for a family was $28,750. Males had a median income of $23,214 versus $18,207 for females. The per capita income for the city was $14,415. About 15.6% of families and 23.2% of the population were below the poverty line, including 33.3% of those under age 18 and 18.1% of those age 65 or over.

Education
Truth or Consequences Schools is the school district for all of the county.

Sierra Elementary Complex and Truth or Consequences Elementary School are elementary schools in the community. Truth or Consequences Middle School and Hot Springs High School, both in Truth or Consequences, are the district's secondary schools.

In popular culture
The city serves as the main setting of the Outbreak event in the Tom Clancy's Rainbow Six Siege video game. It returns again as a region in the spinoff game Tom Clancy's Rainbow Six Extraction.

It was the setting for the Doctor Who episode "The Zygon Invasion".

Truth or Consequences, N.M. is a 1997 American neo-noir film.

See also
 List of municipalities in New Mexico
 Hot Springs Bathhouse and Commercial Historic District in Truth or Consequences

References

External links

TorCNM.org, official website of the City of Truth or Consequences
 

Cities in New Mexico
Cities in Sierra County, New Mexico
Hot springs of New Mexico
County seats in New Mexico
Bodies of water of Sierra County, New Mexico
New Mexico populated places on the Rio Grande